Srobotnik ob Kolpi is a small settlement on the left bank of the Kolpa River in the Kostel in southern Slovenia. The area is part of the traditional region of Lower Carniola and is now included in the Southeast Slovenia Statistical Region.

Name
The name of the settlement was changed from Srobotnik to Srobotnik ob Kolpi in 1953.

Church
The local church, built on a small promontory above the Kolpa River west of the settlement, is dedicated to Saint Anne. It dates to the 19th century.

References

External links
Srobotnik ob Kolpi on Geopedia

Populated places in the Municipality of Kostel